"DND" ("Do Not Disturb") is a song by American rapper Polo G, released on April 10, 2020 as the third single from his second studio album The Goat (2020). It was produced by WayneOnABeat.

Composition
Lake Schatz of Consequence of Sound describes the song as Polo G "shutting out the world and nearly drowning in his own dark thoughts". Lyrically, the song finds him "muttering sadly" about "assorted bad feelings" such as isolation and betrayal. He sing-raps: "Snakes in the grass, watch out for rats and all the feline / I cut everybody off, keep hittin' decline / I swear these painkillers got me on the deep vibe / Miss the old days, got me wishin' I could rewind."

Music video
A music video was released alongside the single and directed by Jordan Wozy. It opens with Polo G putting his phone on "Do Not Disturb" and counting money. He is "cooped up in an empty house", and takes a "solo nighttime drive" as well.

Charts

Certifications

References

2020 singles
2020 songs
Polo G songs
Columbia Records singles
Songs written by Polo G